Christian Brøns Petersen (born 1977) is a Danish singer.

In 2001, Christian took part in the first season of TV Danmark's reality television series Big Brother, but withdrew in protest. Shortly after he signed with Spin Music releasing his debut album Du kan gøre hvad du vil in 2001. The title track from the album was chosen as the Best Hit on Denmark's P3 radio station. It is a cover version of a song written by Patrik Isaksson in 1999. Next single was "Tilbage hvor vi var", a duet with Patrik Isaksson and another major hit reaching number 1 on Tracklisten, the official Danish Singles Chart. Consequently Christian Brøns won two Danish Music Awards for "Best Newcomer" and "Best Pop Album".

The follow-up album Opfølgeren Velkommen in 2002 was certified gold on Universal Music. In 2006, he released his third album Turist and after an absence of 4 years the album Det løser sig on ArtPeople label.

In Christian Brons took part with Patrik Isaksson in Dansk Melodi Grand Prix with the duet "Venter" (meaning "Waiting" in Danish) written by the two in a bid to represent Denmark in the Eurovision Song Contest coming third overall. On 23 January 2012 Brøns released his fifth album  with Black Pelican/Sony Music engaging on a new joint tour with Isaksson.

Discography

Albums

Singles

Featured in
2011: "Du er den" (Denz feat. Christian Brøns)

References

1977 births
Living people
21st-century Danish male  singers
People from Gribskov Municipality